Henry Howell (March 6, 1828 – November 24, 1896) was a Mormon pioneer and one of the founders of Fish Haven, Idaho, USA.

Biography
Howell was born in Essex, England. He married 27-year-old Frances Goble in 1855, one month before emigrating to the United States where he settled in Philadelphia for five years. In 1860 Howell crossed the plains to Salt Lake City. In 1864, he helped pioneer Bear Lake County, Idaho, where he first helped settle Paris and then Fish Haven, Idaho. Unlike some other Mormons at the time, Howell did not practice plural marriage. He died at Fish Haven.

Notes

1828 births
1896 deaths
American city founders
Converts to Mormonism
English emigrants to the United States
English Latter Day Saints
Mormon pioneers
People from Paris, Idaho
People from Essex
People from Bear Lake County, Idaho